Events in the year 1944 in Brazil.

Incumbents

Federal government
President: Getúlio Vargas

Governors
 Alagoas: Ismar de Góis Monteiro
 Amazonas: Álvaro Botelho Maia
 Bahia: Renato Onofre Pinto Aleixo
 Ceará: Francisco de Meneses Pimentel
 Espírito Santo: João Punaro Bley 
 Goiás: Pedro Ludovico Teixeira
 Maranhão: 
 Mato Grosso: Júlio Strübing Müller
 Minas Gerais: Benedito Valadares Ribeiro
 Pará: Magalhães Barata
 Paraíba: Rui Carneiro
 Paraná: Manuel Ribas
 Pernambuco: Agamenon Magalhães
 Piauí: Leônidas Melo
 Rio Grande do Norte: Rafael Fernandes Gurjão/Antonio Fernandes Dantas
 Rio Grande do Sul: Ernesto Dornelles
 Santa Catarina: Nereu Ramos
 São Paulo: Fernando de Sousa Costa
 Sergipe: Augusto Maynard Gomes

Vice governors
 Rio Grande do Norte: no vice governor
 São Paulo: no vice governor

Events
1 January - The former Royal Military Academy expends into the city of Resende.
2 July - Second World War: The first five thousand Brazilian Expeditionary Force soldiers, the 6th RCT, leave Brazil for Europe aboard the USNS General Mann.
September - Brazilian air-land forces go into action in Italy.
31 October - Brazilian pilots begin operations, as individual elements of flights attached to 350th FG squadrons.
date unknown
The Banco Nacional is founded in São Paulo.
Getúlio Vargas allocated an area of 4 million square meters near Santa Maria for the purpose of building an aerodrome.  Santa Maria Airport opens the following year.

Arts and culture

Books
Jorge Amado - São Jorge dos Ilhéus
Oswald de Andrade - Meu Testamento

Films
Corações Sem Piloto
Berlim na Batucada
É Proibido Sonhar
O Brasileiro João de Souza

Music
Camargo Guarnieri - Symphony no 1

Births
8 February - Sebastião Salgado, photojournalist
19 June - Chico Buarque, singer, dramatist, writer and poet
2 August - Naná Vasconcelos, jazz musician (died 2016)
18 October - Nelson Freire, pianist (died 2021)
9 November - Torquato Neto, journalist, poet and songwriter (died 1972)
13 December - Luiz Eduardo de Oliveira ("Léo"), comics creator

Deaths
29 April - Bernardino Machado, President of Portugal 1915–17 and 1925–26 (born 1851)

References

See also 
1944 in Brazilian football
List of Brazilian films of 1944

 
1940s in Brazil
Years of the 20th century in Brazil
Brazil
Brazil